CRESST may refer to:
 National Center for Research on Evaluation, Standards, and Student Testing, an American research partnership
 Cryogenic Rare Event Search with Superconducting Thermometers, a European physics group